Katia Loritz (4 November 1932 – 16 August 2015), born Margrith Anna Loritz, was a Swiss-born Spanish-based actress.

Biography
Loritz was born in St. Gallen, Switzerland. After her primary studies in her home town, she moved to Munich, where she studied dramatic arts. She moved to Spain in the mid-1950s and soon after started her Spanish movie career with the film, Las manos sucias (1957) With her next movie Las chicas de la Cruz Roja (1958) by Rafael J. Salvia, which was successful at the box-office.

She also painted and in her later years exhibited her work professionally.

Loritz died in Madrid on 16 August 2015 due to lung cancer.

Filmography
Las manos sucias (1957), Teresa
Las chicas de la Cruz Roja (1958), Marion
Mi calle (1960), Carmela
Litri and His Shadow (1960)
The Prince in Chains (1960)
Kill and Be Killed (1962)
You and Me Are Three (1962)
Atraco a las tres (1962), Katia Durán
What Have I Done to Deserve This? (1984), Ingrid Muller

References

External links
 Katia Loritz Art
 

1932 births
2015 deaths
People from St. Gallen (city)
Spanish film actresses
Swiss film actresses
Swiss expatriates in Spain
Deaths from lung cancer in Spain